The 1949 Morgan State Bears football team was an American football team that represented Morgan State College in the Colored Intercollegiate Athletic Association (CIAA) during the 1949 college football season. In their 20th season under head coach Edward P. Hurt, the Bears compiled an 8–0 record, won the CIAA championship, shut out four of eight opponents, and outscored all opponents by a total of 226 to 33. The Bears were recognized by the Pittsburgh Courier, using the Dickinson Rating System, as the 1949 black college national champion.

Schedule

References

Morgan State
Morgan State Bears football seasons
Black college football national champions
College football undefeated seasons
Morgan State Bears football